Aviones de Renta de Quintana Roo, S.A. de C.V. (operating as Avioquintana) is an air taxi service based in Quintana Roo, in Mexico. His owner was Mario Hermosillo Torres, a very important pilot in his age. It was established and started operations in 1997 and operates domestic private charter services. Its main base is Cancún International Airport, with a hub at Chetumal International Airport.

Fleet 
The Avioquintana has now no own aircraft (as at September 2020):

Former fleet
1 Embraer EMB 120RT Brasilia
1 Fairchild Metro II

References

External links
Avioquintana 

Airlines of Cancun
Airlines established in 1997
Airlines of Mexico